The 2022 USL League Two season is the 28th season of USL League Two.

The regular season began on May 1 and ended on July 17. 113 teams participated in this season.

Team changes

New teams

Ballard FC (Seattle, WA)
Blackwatch Rush (Albany, NY)
Blue Goose SC (Shreveport, LA)
Boston City FC (Revere, MA)
Caledonia SC (Lakeland, FL)
Central Valley Fuego FC 2
Chicago City SC
Chicago Dutch Lions FC
Christos FC (Baltimore, MD)
Cleveland Force SC
Colorado International Soccer Academy (Aurora, CO)
Commonwealth Cardinals FC (Fredericksburg, VA)
Davis Legacy SC (Davis, CA)
AC Houston Sur
Hudson Valley Hammers (Hudson Valley, NY)
One Knoxville SC

Lansing City Football
LA Parish AC (Baton Rouge, LA)
Louisiana Krewe FC (Lafayette, LA)
Miami AC
Marin FC Legends (Marin County, CA)
Midwest United FC (Grand Rapids, MI)
Minneapolis City SC
New Mexico United U-23 (Albuquerque, NM)
NONA FC (Orlando, FL)
Oly Town FC (Olympia, WA)
Patuxent Football Athletics (Patuxent, MD)
St. Croix SC (Stillwater, MN)
Springfield Athletic SC (Springfield, IL)
Tennessee SC (Franklin, TN)
Vermont Green FC (Burlington, VT)

Returning teams
FC Manitoba
St. Louis Lions
Thunder Bay Chill

Departing teams
Calgary Foothills FC
Grand Rapids FC
Green Bay Voyageurs
New York Red Bulls U-23
Saint Louis Scott Gallagher
Santa Cruz Breakers FC

Name changes
FC Málaga City New York to Pathfinder FC
Colorado Rush SC to Flatirons Rush SC
Ogden City SC to Salt City SC
Portland Timbers U23s to Capital FC (Salem, OR)

Teams

Standings

Eastern Conference

Northeast Division

Mid Atlantic Division

Metropolitan Division

Chesapeake Division

Central Conference

Great Lakes Division

Heartland Division

Valley Division

Deep North Division

Southern Conference

South Central Division

Southeast Division

South Atlantic Division

Mid South Division

Lone Star Division

Western Conference

Mountain Division

Northwest Division

Southwest Division

Playoffs

Bracket

USL League Two Championship 

Championship MVP: Nathaniel Opoku (VCF)

Awards

All-League and All-Conference Teams

Eastern Conference
F: Ben Stitz (CHR), Ryan Carmichael (LIR), Braudilio Rodrigues (WMP) *
M: Taig Healy (SUP), Diba Nwegbo (VER), Peter Stroud (MOT/TOB) *
D: Moise Bombito (SUP) *, Bjarne Thiesen (LIR) *, Nicolas Oberrauch (WMP), Samory Powder (HVH) *
G: Wessel Speel (LIR) *

Southern Conference
F: Ethan Stevenson (BVC), Quesi Weston (LAK), Kemy Amiche (ASH) *
M: Tom Marriott (SCU), Joao Gomeiro (NCF) *, JC Ngando (SGT)
D: Joel Sangwa (NONA), Ben Weimann (NCF), Bissaffi Dotte (ASH), Moses Mensah (KNOX) *
G: Max Collingwood (WVU)

Central Conference
F: Kainan Dos Santos (SBL), Telvin Vah (STC), Matt Whelan (KAL)
M: Curt Calov (AAA), Eliot Goldthorp (DMM), Ryley Kraft (DMM) *
D: Tyler Freitas (PEO), Kori Cupid (DMM), Tom Abrahamsson (FTW), Hugo Bacharach (FCB)
G: Evan Barker (FCM)

Western Conference
F: Logan Farrington (VCF), Ian Mejia (BAL), Nathaniel Opoku (VCF) *
M: Kevin Lo (SFG), Marley Edwards (VCF), Jose Sosa (CAP)
D: Lesia Thetsane (BAL), Javi Ruiz Duran (51O), Kolade Salaudeen (OVF), Robin Terry (LUN)
G: Jason Smith (PCW)

* denotes All-League player

References

External links
 USL League Two website

2022
2022 in American soccer leagues
2022 in Canadian soccer